The following is a list of the IRMA's number-one singles of 1990.

Three consecutive number ones ("Give It A Lash Jack", "The Game", and "Put 'Em Under Pressure") related to the Republic of Ireland team's competing in the 1990 FIFA World Cup.

18 number ones
Most number ones: All artists one number one
Most weeks at number one (single): "Put 'Em Under Pressure" - The Republic of Ireland Football Squad (13 weeks)
Most weeks at number one (artist): The Republic of Ireland Football Squad (13 weeks)

See also
1990 in music
List of artists who reached number one in Ireland

1990 in Irish music
1990 record charts
1990